The 1884 Philadelphia mayoral election saw William Burns Smith defeat incumbent mayor Samuel G. King. This would ultimately be the last election to a three-year term as mayor, as the city subsequently extended mayoral terms to four years.

Results

References

1884
Philadelphia
Philadelphia mayoral
19th century in Philadelphia